Major General Levi R. Chase (23 December 1917 – 4 September 1994) was an American fighter pilot and double flying ace during World War II. Chase served for 33 years including four combat tours across three different wars: World War II, Korea, and Vietnam, he flew 512 combat missions in total.

Early life and education
He was born in Cortland, New York, in 1917. He graduated from Cortland High School, in 1936, and attended Syracuse University from 1937 through 1940.

Military career
He entered active military duty in the United States Army Air Corps as an aviation cadet in February 1941, and graduated from advanced flying training at Maxwell Field, Alabama, with his commission as Second lieutenant in the Army Air Corps and pilot wings in September 1941.

He then was assigned to the 8th Pursuit Group (Interceptor) at Mitchel Field, New York, as a pilot. He joined the 58th Pursuit Squadron, 33d Pursuit Group, at Philadelphia, Pennsylvania, in December 1941. As a member of the 33d Pursuit Group, he flew a P-40 Warhawk from the aircraft carrier  during Operation Torch, the Allied invasion of North Africa. As commander of the 60th Fighter Squadron he completed his first combat tour as the leading American ace in Tunisia with 10 victories.

From July 1943 to March 1944, he served as an assistant operations officer for the I Fighter Command Headquarters at Mitchel Field. From March through June 1944 he was base commander at Hills Grove Army Air Field, New York, and then operations officer and later deputy commander, 2d Air Commando Group, Lakeland Army Air Field, Florida.

He went with the 2d Air Commando Group to the China Burma India Theater of Operations in July 1944 and served as deputy commander and later became commander of the First Provisional Group. He is credited with the destruction of two Japanese fighter aircraft and is the one of the few American pilots to have shot down aircraft flown by three major Axis powers during World War II.

Chase became a member of the Inactive Reserve in May 1945 and returned to civilian life as a New York State veteran's counselor. During this time he attended the Albany Law School, New York, from 1946 to 1949.

He was recalled to active military duty in April 1951. He served successively as the deputy commander of the 1st Fighter Group, Griffiss Air Force Base, New York; executive officer of the 56th Fighter Interceptor Wing, Selfridge Air Force Base, Michigan; and then commander of the 63d Fighter Interceptor Squadron, Oscoda Air Force Base, Michigan. In November 1951 he went to Osan Air Base, South Korea. During his tour of duty in Korea, he was named deputy for operations, 51st Fighter Interceptor Wing, and later he commanded the 8th Fighter-Bomber Group. He flew combat missions in the F-86 Sabre and the F-80 Shooting Star. In June 1952, he led the 8th Fighter-Bomber Group's attack on the Sui-ho Dam.

In December 1952 he assumed command of the 3600th Combat Crew Fighter Training Group, Luke Air Force Base, Arizona, where he organized the original Thunderbirds aerial demonstration team. In June 1955 he became a student at the Air War College, Maxwell Air Force Base, Alabama. After graduation in June 1966, he served for three years as chief of both the Air Defense Branch and the Tactical Branch of the Inspector General's Office at Norton Air Force Base, California.

He attended the National War College, Washington, D.C., from August 1959 to June 1960. He spent the next four years in West Germany where he served with the 50th Tactical Fighter Wing, Hahn Air Base, and then the 7499th Support Group, Wiesbaden Air Base. In July 1964 he was named commander of the 15th Tactical Fighter Wing, MacDill Air Force Base, Florida.

He was transferred to Cam Ranh Bay Air Base, South Vietnam, in October 1965 as commander of the 12th Tactical Fighter Wing. In September 1966 he completed his 500th combat mission flying an F-4C Phantom on a ground attack mission. In December 1966 he was transferred to Kadena Air Base, Okinawa, as vice commander of the 313th Air Division. In November 1967 he became commander of the 327th Air Division and chief, Air Section, Military Assistance Advisory Group, China, Taiwan.

In July 1969 he was assigned to Tactical Air Command Headquarters, Langley Air Force Base, Virginia, as assistant deputy chief of staff, operations, and in October 1970 became deputy chief of staff, personnel. He became vice commander of the Ninth Air Force at Shaw Air Force Base, South Carolina, in July 1971. He was promoted to commander Ninth Air Force, effective 1 June 1973. He retired from the USAF on 1 December 1973.

Awards and decorations
His military decorations included: Silver Star (2 oak leaf clusters), Distinguished Flying Cross (United States) (5 oak leaf clusters), Bronze Star Medal, Purple Heart, Air Medal (27 oak leaf clusters), the British Distinguished Flying Cross and Bar, the Croix de Guerre (with palm), and the Republic of China Order of Cloud and Banner 4th Class.

References

1917 births
1994 deaths
American Korean War pilots
American Vietnam War pilots
American World War II flying aces
Aviators from New York (state)
Recipients of the Air Force Distinguished Service Medal
Recipients of the Air Medal
Recipients of the Croix de Guerre (France)
Recipients of the Distinguished Flying Cross (United Kingdom)
Recipients of the Distinguished Flying Cross (United States)
Recipients of the Silver Star
United States Air Force generals
United States Army Air Forces pilots of World War II
United States Air Force personnel of the Vietnam War